Empress Dowager Liu may refer to:

Empress Liu (Shi Le's wife) (died 333), empress dowager of the Later Zhao dynasty during Shi Hong's reign
Empress Liu (Shi Hu's wife) (318–349), empress dowager of the Later Zhao dynasty during Shi Shi's reign
Empress Liu (Chen dynasty) (534–616), empress dowager of the Chen dynasty
Empress Dowager Liu (Sui dynasty) ( 605–618), empress dowager of the Sui dynasty
Empress Dowager Liu (Later Jin) (died 942), empress dowager and grand empress dowager of the Later Jin dynasty
Empress Liu (Zhenzong) (969–1033), empress dowager during Emperor Renzong of Song's reign
Empress Liu (Zhezong) (1079–1113), empress dowager during Emperor Huizong of Song's reign

See also
 Empress Liu (disambiguation)

Liu